Chiyako (written: 千夜子, 智哉子 or チヤコ in katakana) is a feminine Japanese given name. Notable people with the name include:

, Japanese singer
, Japanese voice actress
, Japanese politician

Japanese feminine given names